The 1994 Vuelta a España was the 49th edition of the Vuelta a España, one of cycling's Grand Tours. The Vuelta began in Valladolid, with an individual time trial on 25 April, and Stage 12 occurred on 6 May with a stage from Benasque. The race finished in Madrid on 15 May.

Stage 12
6 May 1994 — Benasque to Zaragoza,

Stage 13
7 May 1994 — Zaragoza to Pamplona,

Stage 14
8 May 1994 — Pamplona to Sierra de la Demanda,

Stage 15
9 May 1994 — Santo Domingo de la Calzada to Santander,

Stage 16
10 May 1994 — Santander to Lakes of Covadonga,

Stage 17
11 May 1994 — Cangas de Onís to Monte Naranco,

Stage 18
12 May 1994 — Ávila to Ávila,

Stage 19
13 May 1994 — Ávila to Palazuelos de Eresma,

Stage 20
14 May 1994 — Segovia to Palazuelos de Eresma,  (ITT)

Stage 21
15 May 1994 — Palazuelos de Eresma to Madrid,

References

12
1994,12